The 2002 Pan American Cycling Championships took place at the José Luis Recalde Velodrome in Quito, Ecuador August 18–23, 2002, and served as a qualifier for the cycling events at the 2003 Pan American Games. Mexico became champion after winning six golds, four silver and one bronze medal.

Medal summary

Road

Men

Women

Under 23 Men

Track

Men

Women

Notes

References

Americas
Americas
Cycling
Pan American Road and Track Championships